Robert J. Cargo  (October 1, 1868 – April 27, 1904) was a former professional baseball shortstop who played two games for the 1892 Pittsburgh Pirates. He remained active in the minor leagues through 1903. He died of pneumonia in 1904, which he contracted during his playing career.

Early life
Robert J. Cargo was born on October 1, 1868 in Pittsburgh, Pennsylvania, to Robert and Martha Cargo. At the 1880 United States Census, Robert Sr. worked as a "stockdealer", while Martha was unemployed, with her occupation listed as a "kh" [keephouse]. The family lived in the 11th Ward of Pittsburgh.

References

External links

1868 births
1903 deaths
Major League Baseball shortstops
Baseball players from Pennsylvania
19th-century baseball players
Pittsburgh Pirates players
Steubenville Stubs players
Wilkes-Barre Coal Barons players
Buffalo Bisons (minor league) players
Altoona Mud Turtles players
Johnstown Terrors players
Carbondale Anthracites players
Lancaster Chicks players
Newark Colts players
Wilmington Peaches players
Canandaigua Rustlers players
Canandaigua Giants players
New Castle Quakers players
Toledo Swamp Angels players
Nashville Vols players
Deaths from pneumonia in Georgia (U.S. state)